Dorothy Rice may refer to:

Dorothy P. Rice (1922–2017), American health statistician
Dorothy Rice Sims (1889–1960), American sportswoman, aviator, bridge player, artist, and journalist
Dorothy Vicary, English novelist who wrote A Secret at Sprayle under the name Dorothy Mary Rice